The Big Steal is a 1949 American black-and-white film noir reteaming Out of the Past stars Robert Mitchum and Jane Greer. The film was directed by Don Siegel, based on the short story "The Road to Carmichael's" by Richard Wormser.

Plot
U.S. Army lieutenant Duke Halliday (Robert Mitchum) is robbed of a $300,000 payroll by Jim Fiske (Patric Knowles). When Halliday's superior, Captain Vincent Blake (William Bendix), suspects him of having taken part in the theft, Halliday pursues Fiske into Mexico. Along the way, he runs into Joan Graham (Jane Greer), who is after the $2000 she loaned to her boyfriend, Fiske. The two join forces, though they are not sure at first if they can trust each other. Fiske stays one step ahead of the couple, while they are in turn chased by Blake. When Halliday is knocked down trying to stop Fiske from getting away, he comes to the attention of Police Inspector General Ortega (Ramon Novarro). Halliday claims to be Blake, using identification he took from the captain after a brawl. Ortega lets him go after Fiske, but keeps an eye on him. His suspicions are confirmed when the real Blake shows up at his office for help.

Halliday and Graham track Fiske to an isolated house in the desert, where Fiske is meeting with Seton (John Qualen), a fence who offers Fiske $150,000 in untraceable bills in exchange for the payroll. The couple are captured by Seton's henchmen. When Blake shows up, Halliday is initially relieved to be rescued, until he learns that Blake is actually Fiske's partner in crime.

Fiske wants to take Graham with him, but Blake makes it clear that he intends to dispose of both her and Halliday. Fiske reluctantly gives in. However, when he starts to leave, Blake shoots him in the back, explaining that his ex-partner, apparently still at large, can take the blame for the missing payroll. Halliday then points out to Seton that if Blake gets rid of him too, he can give the stolen money back to the army and keep the $150,000 for himself. Taking no chances, Seton pulls a gun on Blake. When Graham creates a distraction, a fight breaks out, which Graham and Halliday win.

In the final scene, Graham and Holliday are talking about what they'll do now that their problems have been cleared up.  Neither really wants to say goodbye. He has to go back to the army, but she's got other plans.  Some Mexican children run up to them, laughing, while music plays. He smiles at her suggestively.  She blushes.  The film ends.

Cast

 Robert Mitchum as Lt. Duke Halliday
 Jane Greer as Joan Graham
 William Bendix as Capt. Vincent Blake
 Patric Knowles as Jim Fiske
 Ramon Novarro as Inspector General Ortega
 Don Alvarado as Lt. Ruiz
 John Qualen as Julius Seton
 Pascual García Peña as Manuel

Production

Casting
Robert Mitchum's arrest for possession of marijuana on September 1, 1948, and his subsequent conviction and incarceration, had a large impact on the production of The Big Steal. RKO head Howard Hughes saw Mitchum's notoriety surrounding the arrest (the actor already seen as a 'bad boy' in Hollywood) as a positive that would boost attention for a rather low-rent - but hopefully profitable - production.

George Raft was originally cast, but was replaced by Mitchum after the arrest. Lizabeth Scott was slated for the female lead but quit three weeks prior to filming due to the arrest, and was replaced by Jane Greer (Mitchum and Greer had been earlier paired in the successful 1947 noir Out of the Past). Hughes had been keeping Greer, a former girlfriend, from appearing in any RKO films in an attempt to ruin her career, but finally conceded when no other actress would take the part.

Filming
Filming (Los Angeles and Tehuacán, Puebla, Mexico) was rushed to capitalize on the situation, with some scenes shot while Mitchum was still incarcerated. Greer's pregnancy also added to the urgency and ensured that the schedule was kept tight. This was part of the reason for the film's relatively short 71 minute runtime.

Release
Capitalizing on Michum's headlines was a proven scheme for Hughes, who, immediately following the arrest, had pushed for another of Mitchum's pictures, Rachel and the Stranger, to be released sooner than planned. Rachel was released on September 18, 1948, and became one of the year's biggest hits.

Reception

Critical response
Channel 4 film reviews describes the movie as "Sparkling dialogues, fast-paced chases and the occasional twist make this an at first somewhat confusing but ultimately hugely entertaining film."

Hal Erickson writing for AllMovie calls the film "tautly directed by Don Siegel, who manages to pack plenty of twists and turns into the film's crowded 71 minutes."

References

Notes

External links
 
 
 
 
 
 The Big Steal at DVD Beaver (includes images)
 

1949 films
1940s crime thriller films
American black-and-white films
American crime thriller films
American chase films
Estudios Churubusco films
Film noir
Films scored by Leigh Harline
Films based on short fiction
Films directed by Don Siegel
Films set in Mexico
RKO Pictures films
1940s English-language films
1940s American films